Frederick Scott Archer (1813 – 1 May 1857) was an English photographer and sculptor who is best known for having invented the photographic collodion process which preceded the modern gelatin emulsion. He was born in either Bishop's Stortford or Hertford, within the county of Hertfordshire, England (United Kingdom of Great Britain and Ireland) and is remembered mainly for this single achievement which greatly increased the accessibility of photography for the general public.

Life
Scott Archer was the second son of a butcher in Bishops Stortford in Hertfordshire who went to London to take an apprenticeship as a goldsmith and silversmith with a Mr Massey of 116 Leadenhall Street.
 
On the recommendation of Edward Hawkins he trained at the Royal Academy Schools a sculptor and found calotype photography useful as a way of capturing images of his sculptures. 
Dissatisfied with the poor definition and contrast of the calotype and the long exposures needed, Scott Archer invented the new process in 1848 and published it in The Chemist in March 1851, enabling photographers to combine the fine detail of the daguerreotype with the ability to print multiple paper copies like the calotype. In publishing his discovery, he did so knowingly without first patenting it, giving it as a gift to the world.

As a sculptor he exhibited at the Royal Academy from 1836 until 1851.

He died impoverished, as since he did not patent the collodion process he made very little money from it. 
An obituary described him as "a very inconspicuous gentleman, in poor health."

His family received a gift of £747 after his death, raised by public subscription, and a small pension was also provided to support his three children after the death of their mother.

The Royal Photographic Society has a small collection of Scott Archer's photographs; some are also held in the Victoria and Albert Museum.

Archer died on 1 May 1857 of a hereditary cystic disease of the liver which had plagued him for his last 11 weeks and is buried at Kensal Green Cemetery in London.

Known Sculptures
Bust of the Sir George Smart (1839)
Statue of Alfred the Great with he Book of Common Law (1844), Westminster Hall
Bust of Dean of Manchester (1848)
Memorial to Lady Albert Conyngham (1850) in Mickleham Church
Bust of he Marquess of Northampton (1850)
Statue of Gertrude Hanson (1851)

Collection
 International Photography Hall of Fame, St.Louis, Missouri

See also
 Louis-Nicolas Ménard

References

External links
    
Isleworth with natural clouds at  The Royal Collection Trust
"Archer, Frederick Scott" on Oxford Dictionary of National Biography
"Frederick Scott Archer" on The Oxford Companion to the Photograph
"Frederick Scott Archer" on The International Photography Hall of Fame and Museum
"Frederick Scott Archer" at The J. Paul Getty Trust

English inventors
Pioneers of photography
1813 births
1857 deaths
People from Bishop's Stortford
Burials at Kensal Green Cemetery
Photographers from Hertfordshire
19th-century English photographers
British sculptors